Unica ("unique") is the ninth studio album by Puerto Rican singer La India, released on June 1, 2010 on the Top Stop Music label founded by grammy winner Sergio George. It features the song Estupida, which was released as a single in both ballad and salsa versions, and was her 7th #1 hit on the Tropical Billboard Charts, making her the female with the most #1 hits on the chart. The album's release party was held in San Juan, Puerto Rico.

Album information
Unica is the first album since Soy Diferente in 2006 to be released by La India. Unica is also the second album to be produced by George under his newly independent record label, Top Stop Music. George has worked with India since her 2nd album Dicen Que Soy during the RMM years. The first single, Estupida, was released on February 23, 2010 and reached #1 on Latin Tropical Airplay. The album also includes two covers such as Smile and Crying.

Track listing

Reception

David Jeffries of Allmusic gave the album a positive review calling her voice "rich with emotion". He called the single "Estupida" a "towering highlight" and commented that "bittersweet is the album’s overriding emotion".

Awards and recognitions
The 2010 album was nominated for a Latin Grammy for best tropical salsa album. India was the only female artist to be nominated in this category because of problems with Univision she did not even attend the awards ceremony.
 The album's lead single, Estupida, was nominated for song of the year for the "Premio Lo Nuestro" awards.
 The album's quality and success has gotten India a nomination in the "Premio Lo Nuestro" awards for the female tropical artist of the year.

Chart performance
The album sold over 3,000 copies in its first week. On the Tropical Albums chart, Unica debuted at number one. The album had succeeded Aventura's album The Last which was number one for 24 consecutive weeks. Unica was succeeded by Juan Luis Guerra's album Asondeguerra, a week later. On the Top Latin Albums chart, the album debuted and peaked at number four. The album gave India her third number-one entry on the Tropical Albums chart, and fifth overall number one album on the chart, passing Gloria Estefan for the most number-one albums by female artist on the chart.

References

2010 albums
La India albums
Albums produced by Sergio George